Herbert Harold Read FRS, FRSE, FGS, (17 December 1889, in Whitstable – 29 March 1970) was a British geologist  and Professor of Geology at Imperial College. From 1947-1948 he was president of the Geological Society.

Life

He was born at Whitstable in Kent on 17 December 1889 the son of Herbert Read, a dairy farmer, and his wife, Caroline Mary Kearn. He attended St Alphege Church School in Whitstable then Simon Langton Grammar School for Boys in Canterbury. He then studied Sciences at the University of London, graduating BSc in 1911.

In the First World War he served in the Royal Fusiliers seeing active service on the Somme and at Gallipoli. He was invalided out of service in 1917 and returned to HM Geological Survey (Scottish section), where he had begun briefly in 1914. He stayed with the survey until 1931.

In 1927 he was elected a Fellow of the Royal Society of Edinburgh. His proposers were John Horne, Sir John Smith Flett, Murray Macgregor and Sir Edward Battersby Bailey. From 1931 to 1939 he was Professor of Geology at Liverpool University.

He was elected a Fellow of the Royal Society in 1939 and won its Royal Medal in 1963 for "outstanding contributions to the understanding of the processes of rock metamorphism and the origins of granite". He also was awarded the Bigsby Medal in 1935, the Wollaston Medal in 1952 and the Penrose Medal in 1967. He served as Dean of the Royal School of Mines from 1943-45.

He died on 29 March 1970. In 1917 he had married Edith Browning.

Publications
British Regional Geology: The Grampian Highlands. Second edition (1948) revised by A.G. MacGregorGeology: An Introduction to Earth History (1949)The Granite Controversy (1957)Beginning Geology (1966)Later Stages of Earth History'' (1975)

Quotes
"The best geologist is he who has seen the most rocks." (H. H. Read, 1940)

References

1889 births
1970 deaths
People from Whitstable
Alumni of the University of London
20th-century British geologists
Royal Medal winners
Penrose Medal winners
Wollaston Medal winners
Fellows of the Geological Society of London
Academics of Imperial College London
Fellows of the Royal Society
Fellows of the Royal Society of Edinburgh
Presidents of the Geologists' Association